Jeevan Gopal (born 26 April 1997), also known as Master Jeevan, is an Indian film and television actor who appears in Malayalam industry. He is best known for playing Jeem-boom-ba in Alavudinte Albutha Vilakku.

He started his career as a child artist in Malayalam films and serials. He played the protagonist, Mahesh in 2018 soap opera serial Makkal, aired in Mazhavil Manorama. He is currently playing pivotal roles in Surya TV's Kaliveedu and Zee Keralam's Kudumbashree Sharada.

Early life
Jeevan was born on 26 April 1997 on Kollam district of Kerala. He holds a B.A. degree in English literature.

Filmography

Films

Television

Webseries

References

External links
 

Living people

1997 births
Indian television actors
Male actors in Malayalam television